The 1942 Missouri Valley Vikings football team was an American football team that represented Missouri Valley College as a member of the Missouri College Athletic Union (MCAU) during the 1942 college football season. In their sixth season under head coach Volney Ashford, the Vikings compiled a perfect 9–0 record (4–0 against MCAU teams), won the MCAU championship, and outscored opponents by a total of 391 to 59.

The season was part of a 41-game winning streak (1941–1942, 1946–1948) that still ranks as the fifth longest in college football history. Coach Ashford, who led the team during the streak, was later inducted into the College Football Hall of Fame.

Schedule

Notes

References

Missouri Valley
Missouri Valley Vikings football seasons
College football undefeated seasons
Missouri Valley Vikings football